Un grito en la oscuridad, is a Mexican telenovela produced and originally transmitted by Teleprogramas Acapulco, SA.

References 

Televisa telenovelas
Mexican telenovelas
Spanish-language telenovelas
1968 telenovelas
1968 Mexican television series debuts
1968 Mexican television series endings